In Greek mythology, Icarius (Ikários) was a man from Athens who welcomed the god Dionysus.

Mythology 
Icarius was cordial towards Dionysus, who gave his shepherds wine. The shepherds became intoxicated and killed Icarius, thinking he had poisoned them. His daughter Erigone and her dog Maera found his body. Erigone hanged herself over her father's grave. Dionysus was angry and punished Athens with a plague, inflicting insanity on all the unmarried women, who all hanged themselves as Erigone had. The plague did not cease until the Athenians introduced honorific rites for Icarius and Erigone. Icarius was placed in the stars as the constellation Boötes by Dionysus or Zeus who pitied their misfortune. There is a mosaic in Paphos, Cyprus, from a Roman villa from the mid 2nd century A.D. which is called "Dionysus House". The mosaic First wine drinkers describes Dionysus giving the gift of vine and wine to Icarius as a reward for Icarius' generous hospitality. It was probably this Icarius whom Clement of Alexandria referred to as husband of Phanothea, a woman who was believed to have invented the hexameter.

Notes

References 

 Apollodorus, The Library with an English Translation by Sir James George Frazer, F.B.A., F.R.S. in 2 Volumes, Cambridge, MA, Harvard University Press; London, William Heinemann Ltd. 1921. ISBN 0-674-99135-4. Online version at the Perseus Digital Library. Greek text available from the same website.
 Gaius Julius Hyginus, Astronomica from The Myths of Hyginus translated and edited by Mary Grant. University of Kansas Publications in Humanistic Studies. Online version at the Topos Text Project.
 Gaius Julius Hyginus, Fabulae from The Myths of Hyginus translated and edited by Mary Grant. University of Kansas Publications in Humanistic Studies. Online version at the Topos Text Project.
 Nonnus of Panopolis, Dionysiaca translated by William Henry Denham Rouse (1863-1950), from the Loeb Classical Library, Cambridge, MA, Harvard University Press, 1940.  Online version at the Topos Text Project.
 Nonnus of Panopolis, Dionysiaca. 3 Vols. W.H.D. Rouse. Cambridge, MA., Harvard University Press; London, William Heinemann, Ltd. 1940-1942. Greek text available at the Perseus Digital Library.

Attican characters in Greek mythology
Deeds of Zeus
Dionysus in mythology